The following radio stations broadcast on FM frequency 98.0 MHz:

China 
 CNR Business Radio in Tianjin and Zibo
 CNR Radio The Greater Bay in Guangzhou
 CNR The Voice of China in Jilin City

Malaysia
 Era in Kuantan, Pahang

Russia
 Kino FM in Moscow

Singapore
 Power 98 in Singapore

United Kingdom
 BBC Radio 1 in Calder Valley, Campbeltown, Carmarthenshire, Colwyn Bay, Hebden Bridge, Isle of Man, Kenley, Peebles, Pontypridd, South Wales, West Yorkshire
 BBC Three Counties Radio in High Wycombe
 Phoenix FM in Brentwood
 Ujima Radio in Bristol

References

Lists of radio stations by frequency